The IEEE Donald G. Fink Prize Paper Award was established in 1979 by the board of directors of the Institute of Electrical and Electronics Engineers (IEEE) in honor of Donald G. Fink. He was a past president of the Institute of Radio Engineers (IRE), and the first general manager and executive director of the IEEE. Recipients of this award received a certificate and an honorarium. The award was presented annually since 1981 and discontinued in 2016.

Purpose 

This award was given for "the most outstanding survey, review, or tutorial paper published in the IEEE Transactions, Journals, Magazines, or in the Proceedings of the IEEE between 1 January and 31 December of the preceding year". The award recipient was selected from the nominees by IEEE's Prize Papers/Scholarship Awards Committee and Awards Board.

Recipients 
The following people received the IEEE Donald G. Fink Prize Paper Award:

References 

IEEE awards
Awards established in 1979
Donald G. Fink Prize Paper Award